Naogaon Sadar is an Upazila of Naogaon District in Rajshahi Division, Bangladesh.

History

In British India sub-districts were called as "Thana", which were mainly exercised by the police. When development activities became widespread, it was known as a Development Circle. In 1949, Naogaon Sadar was declared as a Thana, in 1960 as a development circle and in 1984 as a sub-district.

Geography

It has more than 80,000 households and total area of about 275.73 km2. It is bounded by Badalgachhi and Mahadebpur upazilas on the north, Raninagar and Manda upazilas on the south, Adamdighi and Akkelpur upazilas on the east, Mahadebpur and Manda upazilas on the west.

Demographics
According to 2011 Bangladesh census, Naogaon Sadar had a population of 405,148. Males constituted 50.48% of the population and females 49.52%. Muslims formed 92.07% of the population, Hindus 7.65%, Christians 0.05% and others 0.23%. Naogaon Sadar had a literacy rate of 53.59% for the population 7 years and above.

Administration
Naogaon Sadar Upazila is divided into Naogaon Municipality and 12 union parishads: Baktiarpur, Balihar, Barshail, Boalia, Chandipur, Dubalhati, Hapania, Hashaighari, Kirtipur, Sailgachhi, Shikarpur, and Tilakpur. The union parishads are subdivided into 237 mauzas and 211 villages.

 Upazila Parishad Chairman: Rafiqul Islam
 MP of Naogaon-5 Constituencies: Barrister Nizam Uddin Jalil John
 Mayor of Naogaon Municipality: Nazmul Haque Sony

Education

According to Banglapedia, Chak Atitha High School, founded in 1914, and Kirtipur Multilateral High School, founded in 1921, are notable secondary schools in the upazila.

See also
Upazilas of Bangladesh
Districts of Bangladesh
Divisions of Bangladesh

References

External links
 Official website 

Upazilas of Naogaon District